Wings of a Continent is a 1941 Canadian short documentary film, part of the Canada Carries On series of short films by the National Film Board of Canada, produced for the Office of Public Information. The film was directed by Raymond Spottiswoode—father of filmmaker Roger Spottiswoode—and produced by Stuart Legg and narrated by Lorne Greene.

Synopsis 
Commercial air transportation in Canada began with bush pilots pioneering air routes in the north and Arctic. A new industry was born and within a few years, the air carriers serving the Canadian north became the largest carriers of airborne cargo in the world. Small bush companies eventually grew into modern airlines, the largest becoming the Trans-Canada Air Lines, offering transcontinental service.

Airlines like Trans-Canada Air Lines operate with the complexity and precision of a well-run machine, relying of the work and effort of every employee, from technicians and mechanics on the ground, the operators at the weather station to the pilot at the controls; each individual plays an important role. With the coming of the Second World War, the airlines in Canada took on a new role.

The strategic use of air transportation in Canada during wartime in connecting the far-flung industries and military stations, is significant. They are the link between the continents flying the great ocean clipper routes across the Atlantic and the Pacific. Canada's air services also serve to unite the battle front in Europe and the battle front in the Pacific.

Planning for a postwar world, Canada's airlines are well fitted to take advantage of the wartime supply routes that were established across the globe.

Production
Wings of a Continent was part of the Canada Carries On series, produced with financial backing from the Wartime Information Board, and was released shortly after the United States went to war. The documentary was created as a morale boosting propaganda film during the Second World War.

The narrator of Wings of a Continent was Lorne Greene, known for his work on both radio broadcasts as a news announcer at CBC as well as narrating many of the Canada Carries On series. His sonorous recitation led to his nickname, "The Voice of Canada", and to some observers, the "voice-of-God". When reading grim battle statistics or as in Wings of a Continent, narrating a particularly serious topic such as Canada going to war, he was "The Voice of Doom".

Reception
As part of the Canada Carries On series, Wings of a Continent was produced in 35 mm for the theatrical market and also released as Les Ailes d'un Continent, a version dubbed in French. Each film was shown over a six-month period as part of the shorts or newsreel segments in approximately 800 theatres across Canada. When shown in Ottawa, the reviewer commented that, "The strategic significance of air transportation in Canada in a world now totally at war is graphically described in the December release of the National Film Board's 'Wings of a Continent'." Along with others in the Canada Carries On series, Wings of a Continent received widespread circulation.

The NFB had an arrangement with Famous Players theatres to ensure that Canadians from coast-to-coast could see the documentary series, with further distribution by Columbia Pictures. After the six-month theatrical tour ended, individual films were made available on 16 mm to schools, libraries, churches and factories, extending the life of these films for another year or two. They were also made available to film libraries operated by university and provincial authorities.

References

Notes

Bibliography

 Bennett, Linda Greene. My Father's Voice: The Biography of Lorne Greene. Bloomington, Indiana: iUniverse, Inc., 2004. .
 Ellis, Jack C. and  Betsy A. McLane. "Theatrical Series". New History of Documentary Film. London: Continuum International Publishing Group, 2005. .
 Lerner, Loren. Canadian Film and Video: A Bibliography and Guide to the Literature. Toronto, Ontario, Canada: University of Toronto Press, 1997. .
 Rist, Peter. Guide to the Cinema(s) of Canada. Westport, Connecticut: Greenwood Publishing Group, 2001. .

External links 
 

1941 films
1941 documentary films
Black-and-white documentary films
1941 short films
English-language Canadian films
Canadian short documentary films
Canadian black-and-white films
National Film Board of Canada documentaries
Canadian World War II propaganda films
Films produced by Stuart Legg
Documentary films about aviation
Aviation history of Canada
Films scored by Lucio Agostini
Canada Carries On
Quebec films
Columbia Pictures short films
1940s Canadian films